Matt Lindenmuth (born March 1, 1981) is an American formerly top-ranked professional vert skater, as well as a professional snowboarder. He is most known for being the first action sports athlete in the world to do a double backflip on a vert ramp, often referred to as a "Double Lindy". At the 2002 Summer X-Games Lindenmuth attempted but failed to pull off the first ever triple backflip on a vert ramp.

Lindenmuth was born in Kutztown, Pennsylvania, He began inline skating with his family when he was 9 years old. At age 14, he joined the pro tour, and has been traveling and competing around the world since 1994. Lindenmuth has competed in ESPN's X Games, NBC's Gravity Games, AST Dew Tour, ASA Pro Tour, LG Word Tour and many other notable international events and competitions.  He is the first inline athlete in the world to land a "Double Lindy" (a double back flip on the vert ramp) and the first action sport athlete to attempt triple back flips on the vert ramp.

In 2004 Lindenmuth also began competing in professional snowboard events including Vans Triple Crown, Vans Cup, Burton Global Open Series, World Superpipe Championships, and US Grand Prix, making him one of the few athletes to compete in multiple sports in both summer and winter X Games, Dew Tour and Gravity Games.

Since competing in the action sports world, Lindenmuth has taken his knowledge and work ethics into a different direction, brewing beer. He went on to establish and run Saucony Creek Brewing Company, an award-winning craft brewery and gastropub located in Kutztown, PA; and The Larimer Brewing in Chester, PA named after General William Larimer Jr.

Vert competitions
 2008 LG Action Sports World Championships, Seattle, WA - Vert: 9th
 2006 Action Sports US Vert Championship, San Diego, CA - Vert: 10th
 2006 Action Sports World Tour, Richmond, VA - Vert: 7th
 2005 LG Action Sports US Championship, Pomona - 5th
 2003 ASA Pro Tour Year-End Ranking (Vert) - 19
 2003 LG Action Sports Championships
 ASA World Championships Vert - 15th
 2003 Gravity Games Vert - 13th
 2003 X Games Vert 18th
 2002 ASA Pro Tour, Baltimore - 9th
 2002 ESPN X Games - 9th
 2002 Gravity Games - 6th
 2001 ASA World Championships - 5th
 2001 Gravity Games - 3rd

References

External links
 expn.go.com
 actionsportstour.com
 espneventmedia.com
 espneventmedia.com
 insider.espn.go.com
 sk8-uk.50megs.com

Vert skaters
1981 births
Living people
X Games athletes